Kinesis may refer to:

 Kinesis (biology), a movement or activity of a cell or an organism in response to a stimulus
 Kinesis (band), an alternative rock band from Bolton, England
 Kinesis (genus), a genus of earwigs
 Kinesis (keyboard), a line of ergonomic computer keyboards
 Kinesis (magazine), a magazine published by Vancouver Status of Women
 Motion, change or activity in Aristotelian philosophical concepts of potentiality and actuality
 Kinesis Industry, a manufacturer of bicycle frames and components
 Kinesis Industry, a holdings company for Kinesis Recruitment and Kinesis Property
 Amazon Kinesis, a real-time data processing platform provided by Amazon Web Services

See also
 Kinetic (disambiguation)
 Kinetics (disambiguation)